Eluru Rural is a partial out growth of Eluru in Eluru district of the Indian state of Andhra Pradesh. It is located in Eluru mandal of Eluru revenue division. It is also a constituent of Eluru urban agglomeration.

Geography

It is located on the north side of Kolleru lake.

Transportation

APSRTC runs buses from Eluru and Bhimavaram to this region. Eluru is the nearby railway station.

References

Neighbourhoods in Eluru
Geography of Eluru district